Sainte-Cécile (Gaumais: Sinte-Cicile) is a village of Wallonia and a district of the municipality of Florenville, located in the province of Luxembourg, Belgium.

Geography

The village is bordered in the east by the Semois, a tributary to the Meuse river.

References

External links
Official web site 

Florenville
Former municipalities of Luxembourg (Belgium)